The Journal of Canadian Studies is a bilingual peer-reviewed academic journal dedicated to the interdisciplinary study of Canada. It is published three times a year by the University of Toronto Press.

Abstracting and indexing
The journal is abstracted and indexed in:

References

External links

University of Toronto Press academic journals
Triannual journals
Publications established in 1966
1966 establishments in Ontario
Canadian studies